This page presents the results of the Men's 9-man Volleyball Tournament at the 1962 Asian Games, which was held from 25 August to 1 September 1962 in Jakarta, Indonesia.

Results

|}

Final standing

References
 Results

External links
OCA official website

Men's Volleyball